David Elrod may refer to:

David Elrod, character in Altars of Desire
David Elrod, musician in The Union Trade